Cosmocampus investigatoris (investigator pipefish) is a species of marine fish of the family Syngnathidae. It is found in the Indo-West Pacific, from the Persian Gulf to the Gulf of Thailand. It lives over sand, mud, and coral bottoms to depths of 15m, where it can grow to lengths of 9 cm. This species is ovoviviparous, with males carrying eggs in a brood pouch until giving birth to live young.

References

Further reading

WoRMS

investigatoris
Marine fish
Taxa named by Sunder Lal Hora
Fish described in 1926